Holzland is the name of a region in the western part of the Palatine Forest in the German state of Rhineland-Palatinate

Location and structure 
The Holzland is clearly bounded by surrounding streams: to the south and southeast by the Schwarzbach, and, to the west and north by its tributary, the Moosalb. Only in the extreme east, by the Steinberg, does the Holzland transition without any clearly defined features into the Frankenweide.

The valleys that border and cut through the Holzland are, in places, largely natural. Many, mighty sandstone rock formations outcrop on the valley sides. Hillsides and heights are covered by valuable mixed forest, except in the immediate vicinity of villages. The old sessile oaks harvested here, which are often several centuries old, earn the highest lumber prices overall.

History 

The quality and density of its stands of trees gives the Holzland ("wood land") its name. Even during times when large areas of the Palatine Forest were depleted by wood pasture practices, charcoal burning and mining, valuable stands of woodland survived for centuries in this area.

Nevertheless, there were clearings here, mainly made in the 9th century in connection with the settlement arrangements of Hornbach Abbey, to whom the hitherto imperial estate had probably been gifted by the Count of Homburg. Lordship over the region was given to Electoral Palatinate. After the dissolution of Hornbach Abbey in 1558 in the wake of the Reformation these rights of ownership went to the House of Palatinate-Zweibrücken, which, from then on, was in perpetual dispute with the Palatinate. As a result, in 1776 there was an exchange treaty, whereby Zweibrücken surrendered its rights in the Holzland to the Electorate.

Population and transport 
The largest municipality and seat of the collective municipality of Waldfischbach-Burgalben lies on the southwestern edge of the area in the Moosalb valley. Upstream are the settlements of  Steinalben and Schopp. In the middle of the Holzland, at a height of 430 m above sea level (NN) lies the tourist resort of Heltersberg, and the hill villages of Geiselberg and Schmalenberg. A total of about 11,500 people live in the Holzland.

The main transport axes are the B 270 federal highway from Pirmasens to Kaiserslautern, which runs through the Moosalb valley from south to north, and the parallel railway line. In the extreme southwest the Holzland reaches Pirmasens Nord station, where the railway line crosses the Queich Valley Railway from Landau to Saarbrücken.

Sights 

In Waldfischbach-Burgalben there is a pilgrimage site, Maria Rosenberg, that goes back to the 12th century. An annual pilgrimage takes place every year on the Thursday after Pentecost. 
The Heltersberg Local History Museum is especially interesting on account of its clogmaker's and shingler's workshop.
At the Hirschalber Mill near Schmalenberg there is one of the largest trout breeding centres in Germany.
Between Schopp and Steinalben there are the ruins of a powder mill that was destroyed in 1927 by a mighty explosion. Until then explosives made here were exported worldwide, particularly for the construction of railway lines.

Leisure and tourism 
The Holzland communities are trying to regain a share of tourism in the Palatine Forest. The Friends of Nature and the Palatine Forest Club maintain several mountain huts. There are campsites by the Clausensee lake, at Hundsweiher and in the Schwarzbach valley.

An extensive network of hiking trails has been signed by the Palatine Forest Club. There are also several mountain bike routes. Especially popular are the ravine-like valleys with ponds and springs around the Heltersberg and the valley of the Hirschalb, which empties into the Moosalb at the power mill.

In Heltersberg is a mountain open-air pool that was completely renovated in 2001.

External links 
 Holzland information

Landscapes of Rhineland-Palatinate
Western Palatinate
Natural regions of the Palatinate Forest